Dinantian is the name of a series or epoch from the Lower Carboniferous system in western Europe between 359.2 to 326.4 million years ago. It can stand for a series of rocks in Europe or the time span in which they were deposited.

The Dinantian is equal to the lower part of the Mississippian series in the international geologic timescale of the ICS. The Dinantian is named for the Belgian city of Dinant where strata of this age occur. The name is still used among European geologists.

Earlier terms for the Dinantian were Bernician from the Anglo-Scottish borderland, and Avonian  (divided into upper (Kidwellian) and lower (Clevedonian) substages) from Kidwelly on the Welsh and Clevedon on the English sides of the Bristol Channel.

References

Mississippian geochronology
Carboniferous Europe
Stratigraphy of Europe
Carboniferous Ireland
Carboniferous Wales
Carboniferous United Kingdom
Dinant
Carboniferous geochronology